Sedum is a large genus of flowering plants in the family Crassulaceae, members of which are commonly known as stonecrops. The genus has been described as containing up to 600 species, subsequently reduced to 400–500. They are leaf succulents found primarily in the Northern Hemisphere, but extending into the southern hemisphere in Africa and South America. The plants vary from annual and creeping herbs to shrubs. The plants have water-storing leaves. The flowers usually have five petals, seldom four or six. There are typically twice as many stamens as petals. Various species formerly classified as Sedum are now in the segregate genera Hylotelephium and Rhodiola.

Well-known European species of Sedum are Sedum acre, Sedum album, Sedum dasyphyllum, Sedum reflexum (also known as Sedum rupestre) and Sedum hispanicum.

Description

Sedum is a genus that includes annual, biennial, and perennial herbs. They are characterised by succulent leaves and stems. The extent of morphological diversity and homoplasy make it impossible to characterise Sedum phenotypicaly.

Taxonomy

Sedum was first formally described by Carl Linnaeus in 1753, with 15 species. Of the genera encompassed by the Crassulaceae family, Sedum is the most species rich, the most morphologically diverse and most complex taxonomically. Historically it was placed in the subfamily Sedoideae, of which it was the type genus. Of the three modern subfamilies of the Crassulaceae, based on molecular phylogenetics Sedum is placed in the subfamily Sempervivoideae. Although the genus has been greatly reduced, from about 600 to 420–470 species, by forming up to 32 segregate genera, it still constitutes a third of the family and is polyphyletic.

Sedum species are found in four of six major crown clades wthin subfamily Sempervivoideae of Crassulaceae and are allocated to tribes, as follows:

In addition at least nine other distinct genera appear to be nested within Sedum. However the number of species found outside of the first two clades (Tribe Sedeae) are only a small fraction of the whole genus. Therefore the current circumscription, which is somewhat artificial and catch-all must be considered unstable. The relationships between the tribes of Sempervivoideae is shown in the cladogram.

There are now thought to be approximately 55 European species. Sedum demonstrates a wide variation in chromosome numbers, and polyploidy is common. Chromosome number is considered an important taxonomic feature.

Earlier authors placed a number of Sedum species outside of these clades, such as S. spurium, S. stellatum and S. kamtschaticum (Telephium clade), that has been segregated into Phedimus (tribe Umbiliceae). Given the substantial taxonomic challenges presented by this highly polyphyletic genus, a number of radical solutions have been proposed for what is described as the "Sedum problem", all of which would require a substantial number of new combinations within Sempervivoideae. Nikulin and colleagues (2016) have recommended that, given the monophyly of Aeonieae and Semperviveae, species of Sedum outside of the tribe Sedeae (all in subgenus Gormania) be removed from the genus and reallocated. However this does not resolve the problem of other genera embedded within Sedum, in Sedeae. In the largest published phylogenetic study (2020), the authors propose placing all taxa within Sedeae in genus Sedum, and transferring all other Sedum species in the remaining Sempervivoideae clades to other genera. This expanded Sedum s.l. would comprise about 755 species.

Subdivision

Linnaeus originally described 15 species, characterised by pentamerous flowers, dividing them into two groups; Planifolia and Teretifolia, based on leaf morphology. with 15 species, and hence bears his name as the botanical authority (L.). By 1828, de Candolle recognized 88 species, in six informal groups. Various attempts have been made to subdivide this large genus, in addition to segregating separate genera, including creation of informal groups, sections, series and subgenera. For an extensive history of subfamily Sedoideae, see .

Gray (1821) divided the 13 species known in Britain at that time into five sections; Rhodiola, Telephium, Sedum, (unnamed) and Aizoon. In 1921 Praeger established ten sections; Rhodiola, Pseudorhodiola, Giraldiina, Telephium, Aizoon, Mexicana, Seda Genuina, Sempervivoides, Epeteium and Telmissa. This was later revised in what is the best known system, that of Berger (1930), who defined 22 subdivisions, which he called Reihe (sections or series). Berger's sections were:

 Rhodiola
 Pseudorhodiola
 Telephium
 Sedastrum
 Hasseanthus
 Lenophyllopsis
 Populisedum
 Graptopetalum
 Monanthella
 Perrierosedum
 Pachysedum
 Dendrosedum
 Fruticisedum
 Leptosedum
 Afrosedum
 Aizoon
 Seda genuina
 Prometheum
 Cyprosedum
 Epeteium
 Sedella
 Telmissa

A number of these, he further subdivided. In contrast, Fröderströmm (1935) adopted a much broader circumscription of the genus, accepting only Sedum and Pseudosedum within the Sedoideae, dividing the former into 9 sections. Although this was followed by numerous other systems, the most widely accepted infrageneric classification following Berger, was by Ohba (1978). Prior to this most species in Sedoideae were placed in genus Sedum. Of these systems, it was observed "No really satisfactory basis for the division of the family into genera has yet been proposed".

Some other authors have added other series, and combined some of the series into groups, such as sections. In particular Sedum section Sedum is divided into series (see Clades)  More recently, two subgenera have been recognised, Gormania and Sedum.
 Gormania: (Britton) Clausen. 110 species from Sempervivum, Aeonium and Leucosedum clades. Europe and North America. 
 Sedum: 320 species from Acre clade. Temperate and subtropical zones of Northern hemisphere (Asia and the Americas).

Subgenus Sedum has been considered as three geographically distinct, but equal sized sections:
 S. sect. Sedum ca. 120 spp. native to Europe, Asia Minor and N. Africa, ranging from N. Africa to central Scandinavia and from Iceland to the Ural Mountains, the Caucasus and Iran. 
 S. sect. Americana Frod.
 S. sect. Asiatica Frod.

S. sect. Sedum includes 54 species native to Europe, which Berger classified into 27 series.

Clades 

Species and series include

Subgenus Gormania
{|
|
Semperviveae  

 S. series Rupestria (Eurasia)
 S. rupestre L.
 S. armenum Boiss. & A.Huet
 S. assyriacum Boiss. (Near East)
 S. mooneyi M.Gilbert (NE Africa)
 S. sediforme (Jacq.) Pau

Of about 80 Eurasian species, series Rupestria forms a distinct monophyletic group of about ten taxa, which some authors have considered a separate genus, Petrosedum. It was series 20 in Berger's classification. Native to Europe it has escaped cultivation and become naturalized in North America.

{|
|
Aeonieae (N Africa)

 S. series Pubescens
 S. pubescens Vahl
 S. series Caerulea
 S. caeruleum 
 S. jaccardianum Maire & Wilczek
 S. series Monanthoidea
 Monanthes atlantica J.Ball (=S. surculosum Coss.)
 S. modestum Boiss.

Embedded within series Monanthoidea are three Macaronesian segregate genera, Aichryson, Monanthes and Aeonium.

{|
|
Sedeae - Leucosedum (Europe/Mediterranean/Near East/Central Asia)

 S. series Aithales (Med)
 S. pallidum M.Bieb.
 S. series Alba (Med)
 S. album L.
 S. gracile C.A.Mey.
 S. magellense Ten.
 S. series Alsinefolia All. (Med)
 S. series Atrata (Med)
 S. series Brevifolia (Med)
 S. series Cepaea (Med)
 S. commixtum Moran & Hutchison
 S. series Convertifolia (Med)
 S. series Dasyphylla (Med)
 S. dasyphyllum L.
 S. series Glauco-rubens (Med)
 S. hispanicum L.
 S. series Gracile (Med)
 S. series Hirsuta (Med)
 S. hirsutum All.

In the Levant, one species of this succulent (S. microcarpum) covers the stony ground like a carpet where the soil is shallow, growing no higher than 5–10 cm. At first, the fleshy leaves are a light green, but as the season progresses, the fleshy leaves turn red.

{|
|
Europe/Mediterranean/Near East/Central Asia

 Sedum series Inconspicua (Med)
 S. ince 't Hart & Alpinar
 S. lydium Boiss.
 S. microcarpum (Sm.) Schönland
 S. series Monregalense (Med)
 S. moranii R.T.Clausen
 S. series Nana (Med)
 S. series Pedicellata (Med)
 S. sedoides (Jacquem. ex Decne.) Pau
 S. series Steico (Med)
 S. series Subrosea (Med)
 S. series Subulata (Med)
 S. series Telmissa (Med)
 S. series Tenella (Med)

 Med = Mediterranean distribution
Embedded within the Leucosedum clade are the following genera: Rosularia, Prometheum, Sedella and Dudleya. Rosularia is paraphyletic, and some Sedum species, such as S. sempervivoides Fischer ex M. Bieberstein are assigned by some authors to Rosularia, as R. sempervivoides (Fischer ex M. Bieberstein) Boriss.

Subgenus Sedum 
{|
|
Sedeae - Acre (Asia/Europe/Macaronesia/N. America)

 S. series Alpestria Berger
 S. alpestre Vill. (Europe)
 S. series Acria 
 S. acre L. (Europe)
 S. bourgaei Hemsl. (Mexico)
 S. bulbiferum Makino (Asia)
 S. burito Moran (Mexico)
 S. cockerellii Britton (N. America)
 S. dendroideum Moc. & Sessé ex DC. (Mexico)
 S. farinosum Lowe (Macaronesia)
 S. furfuraceum Moran (N. America) 
 S. fusiforme Lowe (Macaronesia)
 S. hakonense Makino (Asia)
 S. hemsleanum Rose (N. America) 
 S. japonicum Siebold ex Miq. (Asia)
 S. laconicum Boiss. & Heldr. (Mediterranean)
 S. lineare Thunb. (syn. S. subtile) (Asia)
 S. litoreum Guss.  (Europe)
 S. series Macaronesica (Macaronesia)
 S. makinoi Maxim. (Asia)
 S. meyeri-johannis Engl. (Africa)
 S. mexicanum Britton (Asia)
 S. morrisonense Hayata (Asia)
 S. multicaule Wall. ex Lindl. (Asia)
 S. multiceps Coss. & Durieu (Europe, N Africa, S America)
 S. nudum Aiton (Macaronesia)
 S. oaxacanum Rose (N. America)
 S. obcordatum R.T. Clausen (N. America)
 S. oreades (Decne.) Raym.-Hamet (Asia)
 S. oryzifolium Makino (Asia)
 S. section Pachysedum (N. America)
 S. plumbizincicola X.H.Guo & S.B.Zhou ex L.H.Wu (China)
 S. polytrichoides Hemsl. (Asia)
 S. reptans R.T.Clausen (Mexico)
 S. rubrotinctum R.T. Clausen (Americas, Australasia)
 S. sarmentosum Bunge (Asia)
 S. sexangulare L. (Europe)
 S. ternatum Michx. (N. America)
 S. tosaense Makino (Asia)
 S. triactina A. Berger (Asia)
 S. trullipetalum Hook.f. & Thomson (Asia)
 S. urvillei DC. (Mediterranean)
 S. yabeanum Makino (Asia)
 S. zentaro-tashiroi Makino (Asia)

Embedded within the Acre clade are the following genera: Villadia, Lenophyllum, Graptopetalum, Thompsonella, Echeveria and Pachyphytum. The species within Acre, can be broadly grouped into two subclades, American/European and Asian.

List of selected species

Sedum acre  L. – wall-pepper, goldmoss sedum, goldmoss stonecrop, biting stonecrop
Sedum albomarginatum Clausen – Feather River stonecrop
Sedum album L. – white stonecrop
Sedum alfredii
Sedum anglicum – English stonecrop
Sedum brevifolium
Sedum burrito – baby burro's-tail
Sedum caeruleum
Sedum cauticola
Sedum clavatum
Sedum cyprium
Sedum dasyphyllum L. – thick-leaved stonecrop
Sedum debile S.Watson – orpine stonecrop, weakstem stonecrop
Sedum dendroideum Moc. & Sessé ex A.DC. – tree stonecrop
Sedum divergens S.Watson – spreading stonecrop
Sedum eastwoodiae (Britt.) Berger – Red Mountain stonecrop
Sedum erythrostictum  syn. Hylotelephium erythrostictum 
Sedum glaucophyllum Clausen – cliff stonecrop
Sedum hispanicum  L. – Spanish stonecrop
Sedum lampusae (Kotschy) Boiss. 
Sedum lanceolatum Torr. – lance-leaf stonecrop, lanceleaf stonecrop, spearleaf stonecrop
Sedum laxum (Britt.) Berger – roseflower stonecrop
Sedum lineare – needle stonecrop
Sedum mexicanum Britt. – Mexican stonecrop
Sedum microstachyum (Kotschy) Boiss. – small-spiked stonecrop
Sedum moranii Clausen – Rogue River stonecrop
Sedum morganianum – donkey tail, burro tail
Sedum multiceps – pygmy Joshua tree, dwarf Joshua tree
Sedum niveum A.Davids. – Davidson's stonecrop
Sedum nussbaumerianum  Bitter, syn. Sedum adolphi – golden sedum
Sedum oaxacanum Rose
Sedum oblanceolatum Clausen – oblongleaf stonecrop
Sedum obtusatum Gray – sierra stonecrop
Sedum obtusatum ssp. paradisum Denton – paradise stonecrop
Sedum ochroleucum Chaix – European stonecrop
Sedum oreganum Nutt. – Oregon stonecrop
Sedum oregonense (S.Watson) M.E.Peck – cream stonecrop
Sedum palmeri S.Watson – Palmer's stonecrop
Sedum perezdelarosae Jimeno-Sevilla
Sedum porphyreum Kotschy – purple stonecrop
Sedum pulchellum Michx. – widow's-cross
Sedum radiatum S.Watson – Coast Range stonecrop 
Sedum rubrotinctum – pork and beans, Christmas cheer, jellybeans
Sedum rupestre L. – reflexed stonecrop, blue stonecrop, Jenny's stonecrop, prick-madam
Sedum sarmentosum Bunge – stringy stonecrop
Sedum sediforme  (Jacq.) Pau  pale stonecrop
Sedum sexangulare – tasteless stonecrop
Sedum sieboldii – Siebold's stonecrop
Sedum spathulifolium Hook.f. – Broadleaf stonecrop, Colorado stonecrop
Sedum spurium – Caucasian stonecrop, dragon's blood sedum, two-row stonecrop
Sedum stenopetalum Pursh – wormleaf stonecrop, yellow stonecrop
Sedum telephium  L.
Sedum ternatum Michx. – woodland stonecrop
Sedum takesimense
Sedum telephium
Sedum villosum – hairy stonecrop, purple stonecrop
Sedum weinbergii

Distribution and habitat

Distributed in mainly in temperate to subtropical climates the Northern hemisphere, extending to the Southern hemisphere in Africa and South America, being most diverse in the Mediterranean, Central America, Himalayas, and East Asia. In this respect, the two subgenera differ. Subgenus Sedum having a centre of diversity in Mexico, and Gormania in Eurasia with a secondary centre in N America.

Ecology

Sedum species are used as food plants by the larvae of some Lepidoptera species including the grey chi moth. In particular, Sedum spathulifolium is the host plant of the endangered San Bruno elfin butterfly of San Mateo County, California. Sedum lanceolatum is the host plant of the more common Parnassius smintheus found in the Rocky Mountains. As well as Sedum spathulifolium, many other species of Sedum serve the environmental role of host plants for butterflies. For example, the butterfly Callophrys xami uses several species of Sedum, such as Sedum allantoides, for suitable host plants.

Uses

Ornamental

Many sedums are cultivated as ornamental garden plants, due to their interesting and attractive appearance and hardiness. The various species differ in their requirements; some are cold-hardy but do not tolerate heat, some require heat but do not tolerate cold.

Numerous hybrid cultivars have been developed, of which the following have gained the Royal Horticultural Society's Award of Garden Merit: 
 'Herbstfreude' ('Autumn Joy')
 'Bertram Anderson'
 'Matrona'
 'Ruby Glow'

As food

The leaves of most stonecrops are edible, excepting Sedum rubrotinctum, although toxicity has also been reported in some other species. The juice from the stems and leaves may irritate skin if handled excessively.

Sedum reflexum, known as "prickmadam", "stone orpine", or "crooked yellow stonecrop", is occasionally used as a salad leaf or herb in Europe, including the United Kingdom. It has a slightly astringent sour taste.

Sedum divergens, known as "spreading stonecrop", was eaten by First Nations people in northwest British Columbia. The plant is used as a salad herb by the Haida and the Nisga'a people. It is common in the Nass Valley of British Columbia.

Biting stonecrop (Sedum acre) contains high quantities of piperidine alkaloids (namely (+)-sedridine, (−)-sedamine, sedinone and isopelletierine), which give it a sharp, peppery, acrid taste and make it somewhat toxic.

Roofing

Sedum can be used to provide a roof covering in green roofs, where they are preferred to grasses. The Rolls-Royce Motor Cars plant in Goodwood, England, has a  roof complex covered in Sedum, the largest in the United Kingdom.

Green tramway

Berlin's Prenzlauer Allee, Le Mans, and Warsaw, for example, plant sedum in between rails of some tramways as a low maintenance alternative to grass. This provides beautification, a permeable surface for water management, and noise reduction.

Gallery

Notes

References

Bibliography

Books and theses
 
 
 
 
 
 , in 
 
 
 
 
  (full text at ResearchGate)
  see also Flora Europaea

 Historical
 
 
 
 , see also Species Plantarum

Articles

Websites
 
 
 
 
 
 
 
 
 
 
 
 
 

 Databases and flora
 
 
 
 
  (see also Angiosperm Phylogeny Website)

External links

 
Garden plants
Medicinal plants
Succulent plants
Crassulaceae genera
Taxa named by Carl Linnaeus